The Head Man is a 1928 American drama film directed by Edward F. Cline and written by Gerald Duffy, Howard J. Green, Sidney Lazarus and Harvey F. Thew. The film stars Charles Murray, Loretta Young, Larry Kent, Lucien Littlefield, E. J. Ratcliffe and Irving Bacon. The film was released on July 8, 1928, by First National Pictures.

Cast      
Charles Murray as Watts 
Loretta Young as Carol Watts
Larry Kent as Billy Hurd
Lucien Littlefield as Ed Barnes
E. J. Ratcliffe as Wareham
Irving Bacon as Mayor
Harvey Clark as McKugg
Sylvia Ashton as Mrs. Briggs
Dot Farley as Mrs. Denny
Martha Mattox as Twin
Rosa Gore as Twin

References

External links
 

1928 films
1920s English-language films
Silent American drama films
1928 drama films
First National Pictures films
Films directed by Edward F. Cline
American silent feature films
American black-and-white films
1920s American films